Seung-hyun, also spelled Seung-hyeon, or Seung-hyon, Sung-hyon, is a Korean unisex given name, predominantly masculine. The meaning differs based on the hanja used to write each syllable of the name. There are 17 hanja with the reading "seung" and 42 hanja with the reading "hyun" on the South Korean government's official list of hanja which may be used in given names. Seung-hyun was the 10th-most popular name for baby boys in South Korea in 1990.

People with this name include:

Entertainers
Baek Seung-hyeon (born 1975), South Korean actor
Ji Seung-hyun (actor) (born 1981), South Korean actor
Stephen Seung-hyun Sohn (born 1986), American model of Korean descent
Choi Seung-hyun (born 1987), stage name T.O.P, South Korean male rapper, member of Big Bang
Kang Seung-hyun (born 1987), South Korean female model
Lee Seung-hyun (born 1990), stage name Seungri, South Korean male singer, former member of Big Bang
Song Seung-hyun (born 1992), South Korean male guitarist and singer, member of rock band F.T. Island
Goo Seung-hyun (born 2004), South Korean actor
Choi Seung-hyun, South Korean film score composer

Sportspeople
Ji Seung-hyun (handballer) (born 1979), South Korean male handball player
Kim Seung-hyun (footballer) (born 1979), South Korean male football midfielder and forward
You Seung-hun (born 1983), South Korean male swimmer
Lee Seung-hyun (footballer) (born 1985), South Korean male football winger
Yoon Seung-hyeon (born 1988), South Korean male football winger
Lee Seoung-hyun (born 1992), South Korean male basketball player
Yun Seung-hyun (born 1994), South Korean high jumper
Hong Seung-hyun (born 1996), South Korean male football forward

Other
Park Seung-hyun (born 1984), South Korean male Go player

See also
List of Korean given names

References

Korean unisex given names